Ice Dogs or IceDogs is the name of several ice hockey teams:
Barrington Ice Dogs, junior hockey franchise in Barrington, Nova Scotia, Canada
Bozeman Icedogs, junior ice hockey team in Bozeman, Montana, USA
Dryden Ice Dogs, junior ice hockey team in Dryden, Ontario, Canada
Fairbanks Ice Dogs, junior ice hockey team in Fairbanks, Alaska, USA
Long Beach Ice Dogs, former professional ice hockey team in Long Beach, California, USA
Mississauga IceDogs, junior ice hockey team in Mississauga, Ontario, Canada
Niagara IceDogs, junior ice hockey team in St. Catharines, Ontario, Canada
Salem Ice Dogs, junior ice hockey team in Salem, Massachusetts, USA
Sydney Ice Dogs, ice hockey team in the Sydney, Australia